Three Japanese destroyers have been named Harukaze :

 , a  launched in 1905 and scrapped in 1928
 , a  launched in 1922 and scrapped in 1947
 , a  launched in 1955 and stricken in 1985

Japanese Navy ship names
Imperial Japanese Navy ship names